Martin Luther King Jr. Academy was a four-year (9–12) alternative high school of the Gary Community School Corporation in Gary, Indiana, United States. It closed in 2018.

History
Martin Luther King Jr. Academy opened in 1970, founded to educate dropouts and at-risk students. It is named in honor of civil rights movement leader Martin Luther King Jr., who was assassinated in 1968.

See also
 List of high schools in Indiana

References

External links
Martin Luther King Jr. Academy Official Site

King
King
Educational institutions established in 1970
1970 establishments in Indiana